Buchanania arborescens, commonly known as little gooseberry tree or sparrow's mango, is a small and slender tree native to seasonal tropical forests of northern Australia, south-east Asia, and the Solomon Islands.

The leaves are spirally arranged, smooth, leathery, elongated oblong, 5–26 cm long. The flowers are very small cream to yellowish white. The edible fruit are globular, small (1 cm long), reddish to purple-black.
These are eaten by Torresian imperial pigeons and other birds.

The species was formally described in 1826 by botanist Carl Ludwig Blume based on plant specimens collected from Java. Initially naming it Coniogeton arborescens, Blume transferred the species to the genus Buchanania in  1850.

In Australia the species occurs naturally across the northern extremities of the continent from Western Australia and across the Northern Territory to Queensland where it extends down the east coast as far south as Hinchinbrook Island.

Uses
Aboriginal people eat the fruit raw. The plant is also used as a traditional medicine in Australia and Malaysia. The 1889 book 'The Useful Native Plants of Australia' records that "The unripe fruits of this plant were gathered, and, when boiled, imparted an agreeable acidity to the water, and when thus prepared, tasted tolerably well. When ripe, they become sweet and pulpy, like gooseberries, although their rind is not very thick. This resemblance induced us to call the tree 'the little gooseberry'tree" quoted from Leichhardt: Overland journey to Port Essington, p. 479.

References

External links
 
 

arborescens
Bushfood
Sapindales of Australia
Trees of the Solomon Islands
Rosids of Western Australia
Flora of the Northern Territory
Flora of Queensland